Christmas with Holly is a 2012 made-for-TV film based on the 2010 book Christmas Eve at Friday Harbor by Lisa Kleypas. It originally aired on ABC as a Hallmark Hall of Fame film on December 9, 2012, starring Eloise Mumford and Sean Faris.

Synopsis 
Holly Nagle has not spoken a word since her mother died in a tragic car accident. Her uncle, and legal guardian, Mark Nagle, decides that it's time for him and Holly to start a new life. They do this by moving from Seattle to Friday Harbor to live with Mark's brothers in their vineyard. While there, Mark and Holly meet Maggie Conway who has also just moved to Friday Harbor. Maggie leaves the city after being left at the altar by her fiancé and opens up a toy store. Together, these three lost souls discover each other and the lives they always dreamed they could have.

Cast

Filming
Although set in Washington state, the film was shot entirely in Nova Scotia, Canada in August 2012, in the towns of Halifax, Chester and Windsor.

See also
 List of Christmas films

References

External links

2012 television films
2012 films
Canadian television films
English-language Canadian films
Christmas television films
American Christmas films
Canadian Christmas films
2010s English-language films
Films based on American novels
Films directed by Allan Arkush
Films scored by Nathan Wang
Films set in Seattle
Films set in Washington (state)
Films shot in Nova Scotia
Hallmark Hall of Fame episodes
2010s Canadian films